Pablo is a Spanish masculine given name.

Pablo may also refer to:

Places
 Pablo (Primero de Enero), a Cuban village in Ciego de Ávila Province
 Pablo, Montana, a town in the United States

People
 Michel Pablo (real name Michel Raptis), a Greek leading figure in the Trotskyist Fourth International

Art, entertainment, and media
 Pablo (film), a 2012 American documentary about Pablo Ferro
Pablo (TV series), a 2017 British children's television series centred around a five-year-old boy with autism that airs on CBeebies
 "Pablo", a song by Screaming Jets from their 2004 EP Heart of the Matter
 Pablo Records, a jazz record label
The Life of Pablo, a 2016 hip hop album released by Kanye West
 "Pablo", a song on Kanye West's 2022 album, Donda 2, featuring American rappers Travis Scott and Future

Other uses
 Tropical Storm Pablo

See also
 San Pablo (disambiguation)